Xestia oblata, known generally as the rosy dart or ruby dart, is a species of cutworm or dart moth in the family Noctuidae. It is found in North America.

The MONA or Hodges number for Xestia oblata is 10947.

Subspecies
These two subspecies belong to the species Xestia oblata:
 Xestia oblata oblata
 Xestia oblata streckeri Barnes & Benjamin, 1927

References

Further reading

 
 
 

Xestia
Articles created by Qbugbot
Moths described in 1875